Sui iuris ( or ) also spelled sui juris, is a Latin phrase that literally means "of one's own right". It is used in both secular law and the Catholic Church's canon law. The term church sui iuris is used in the Catholic Code of Canons of the Eastern Churches (CCEO) to denote the autonomous churches in Catholic communion. The Catholic Church consists of 24 churches, including the Latin Church and 23 Eastern Catholic churches.

Etymology, Spelling and Pronunciation
The Latin sui iuris (the individual words meaning 'self' and 'law') corresponds to the Greek 'αὐτόνομος', from which the English word autonomy is derived.

The spelling in Classical Latin is sui iuris and in Medieval Latin sui juris. English Law gets the term from Medieval Latin, and so spells it sui juris. English-speaking lawyers pronounce the phrase as if it were English: the "i" of "sui" rhymes with the English word "eye", and the first syllable of "juris" is pronounced like the English word "Jew": . Catholic Canon Law prefers the classical spelling sui iuris; it is pronounced as in Italian: .

Secular law 

In civil law, the phrase sui juris indicates legal competence, and refers to an adult who has the capacity to manage his or her own affairs. It is opposed to alieni juris, meaning one such as a minor or mentally disabled person who is legally incompetent and under the control of another. It also indicates a person capable of suing and/or being sued in a legal proceeding in his own name (in personam) without the need of an ad litem, that is, a court appointed representative, acting on behalf of a defendant, who is deemed to be incapable of representing himself.

Canon law

Church documents such as the Code of Canons of the Eastern Churches apply the Latin term sui iuris to the particular Churches that are together the Catholic Church, the Roman Catholic Church and those in communion with it. 

By far the largest of the sui iuris churches is the Latin Church. Over that particular church, the Pope exercises his papal authority, and the authority that in other particular churches belongs to a Patriarch. He has, therefore, been referred to also as Patriarch of the West. The other particular Churches are called Eastern Catholic Churches, each of which, if large enough, has its own patriarch or other chief hierarch, with authority over all the bishops of that particular Church or rite.

The same term is applied also to missions that lack enough clergy to be set up as apostolic prefectures but are for various reasons given autonomy and so are not part of any diocese, apostolic vicariate or apostolic prefecture. In 2004, there were eleven such missions: three in the Atlantic, Cayman Islands, Turks and Caicos, and Saint Helena, Ascension and Tristan da Cunha; two in the Pacific, Funafuti (Tuvalu), and Tokelau; and six in central Asia, Afghanistan, Baku (Azerbaijan), Kyrgyzstan, Tajikistan, Turkmenistan, and Uzbekistan.

Examples of Catholic ecclesiastical use

 "The Eastern Catholic Churches are not 'experimental' or 'provisional' communities; these are sui iuris Churches; One, Holy, Catholic and Apostolic, with the firm canonical base of the Code of Canons of the Eastern Churches promulgated by Pope John Paul II."
 "The hierarchy of the Byzantine Metropolitan Church Sui iuris of Pittsburgh, in tile United States of America, gathered in assembly as the Council of Hierarchy of said Church, in conformity with the Code of Canons of the Eastern Churches, ..."
 "It would likewise be helpful to prepare an Empathetical Directory that would 'take into account the special character of the Eastern Churches, so that the biblical and liturgical emphasis as well as the traditions of each Church Sui Iuris in patrology, hagiography and even iconography are highlighted in conveying the catechesis' (CCEO, can. 621, §2)" John Paul II
 "On behalf of the Kyrgyzstan Catholics I would like to express our gratitude to the Holy Father (i.e., the Pope) for his prayers and for all that he has done for us: ... and for the creation of the new 'missioni sui iuris' in Central Asia, in a special way — for the trust placed on the 'Minima Societas Jesu', to which he entrusted the mission in Kyrgyzstan."
 "...[T]he rays originating in the one Lord, the sun of justice which illumines every man (cf. Jn), ... received by each individual Church sui iuris, has value and infinite dynamism and constitutes a part of the universal heritage of the Church." "Instruction for Applying the Liturgical Prescriptions of the Code of Canons of the Eastern Churches", issued January 6, 1996 by the Congregation for the Eastern Churches.

Categories of sui iuris churches

According to CCEO, the Oriental Catholic churches sui iuris are of four categories.

Patriarchal churches
A patriarchal church is a full-grown form of an Eastern Catholic church. It is 'a community of the Christian faithful joined together by' a Patriarchal hierarchy. The Patriarch together with the synod of bishops has the legislative, judicial and administrative powers within jurisdictional territory of the patriarchal church, without prejudice to those powers reserved, in the common law, to the Roman pontiff (CCEO 55-150). Among the Eastern Catholic Churches the following churches are of patriarchal status:

Coptic Catholic Church (1741): Cairo, (163,849), Egypt
Maronite Church (union re-affirmed 1182): Bkerke, (3,105,278), Lebanon, Cyprus, Jordan, Israel, Palestine, Egypt, Syria, Argentina, Brazil, United States, Australia, Canada, Mexico
Syriac Catholic Church (1781): Beirut, (131,692), Lebanon, Iraq, Jordan, Kuwait, Palestine, Egypt, Sudan, Syria, Turkey, United States and Canada, Venezuela
Armenian Catholic Church (1742): Beirut, (375,182), Lebanon, Iran, Iraq, Egypt, Syria, Turkey, Jordan, Palestine, Ukraine, France, Greece, Latin America, Argentina, Romania, United States, Canada, Eastern Europe
Chaldean Catholic Church (1552): Baghdad, (418,194), Iraq, Iran, Lebanon, Egypt, Syria, Turkey, United States
Melkite Greek Catholic Church (definitively 1726): Damascus, (1,346,635), Syria, Lebanon, Jordan, Israel, Jerusalem, Brazil, United States, Canada, Mexico, Iraq, Egypt and Sudan, Kuwait, Australia, Venezuela, Argentina

Major archiepiscopal churches
Major archiepiscopal churches are the oriental churches, governed by the major archbishops being assisted by the respective synod of bishops. These churches also have almost the same rights and obligations of Patriarchal Churches. A major archbishop is the metropolitan of a see determined or recognized by the Supreme authority of the Church, who presides over an entire Eastern Church sui iuris that is not distinguished with the patriarchal title. What is stated in common law concerning patriarchal Churches or patriarchs is understood to be applicable to major archiepiscopal churches or major archbishops, unless the common law expressly provides otherwise or it is evident from the nature of the matter" (CCEO.151, 152). Following are the Major Archiepiscopal Churches:

Syro-Malankara Catholic Church (1930): Thiruvananthapuram, (412,640), India, United Arab Emirates, United States of America
Syro-Malabar Church (1559): Kochi, (3,902,089), India, Middle East, Europe and America
Romanian Church United with Rome, Greek-Catholic (1697): Blaj, (776,529), Romania, United States of America
Ukrainian Greek Catholic Church (1595): Kyiv, (4,223,425), Ukraine, Poland, United States, Canada, Great Britain, Australia, Germany and Scandinavia, France, Brazil, Argentina

Metropolitan churches
A sui iuris church which is governed by a metropolitan is called a metropolitan church sui iuris. "A Metropolitan Church sui iuris is presided over by the Metropolitan of a determined see who has been appointed by the Roman Pontiff and is assisted by a council of hierarchs according to the norm of law" (CCEO. 155§1). The Catholic metropolitan churches are the following:

Ethiopian Catholic Church (1846): Addis Ababa, (208,093), Ethiopia, Eritrea
Ruthenian Catholic Church (1646) – a sui juris metropolia, an eparchy, and an apostolic exarchate: United States (594,465), Canada, Ukraine, Czech Republic.
Slovak Greek Catholic Church (1646): Prešov, (243,335), Slovakia.
Eritrean Catholic Church (2015): Asmara, Eritrea
Hungarian Greek Catholic Church (2015) – Hajdúdorog, (290,000), Hungary

Other sui iuris churches
Other than the above-mentioned three forms of sui iuris churches there are some other sui iuris ecclesiastical communities. It is "a Church sui iuris which is neither patriarchal nor major archiepiscopal nor Metropolitan, and is entrusted to a hierarch who presides over it in accordance with the norm of common law and the particular law established by the Roman Pontiff" (CCEO. 174). The following churches are of this juridical status:

Albanian Greek Catholic Church (1628) – apostolic administration: (3,510), Albania
Belarusian Greek Catholic Church (1596) – no established hierarchy at present: (10,000), Belarus
Bulgarian Greek Catholic Church (1861) – apostolic exarchate: Sofia, (10,107), Bulgaria
Byzantine Catholic Church of Croatia and Serbia (1611) – an eparchy and an apostolic exarchate: Eparchy of Križevci for Croatia, Slovenia and Bosnia-Herzegovina, and Byzantine Catholic Apostolic Exarchate of Serbia; (21,480) + (22,653)
Greek Byzantine Catholic Church (1829) – two apostolic exarchates: Athens, (2,325), Greece, Turkey
Italo-Albanian Catholic Church (never separated) – two eparchies and a territorial abbacy: (63,240), Italy
Macedonian Greek Catholic Church (1918) – an eparchy: Skopje, (11,491), Republic of Macedonia
Russian Greek Catholic Church (1905) – two apostolic exarchates, at present with no published hierarchs: Russia, China; currently about 20 parishes and communities scattered around the world, including five in Russia itself, answering to bishops of other jurisdictions

See also
List of Latin legal terms
List of Latin phrases

References

Footnotes

Sources 

 Vere, Pete, & Michael Trueman, Surprised by Canon Law, Volume 2: More Questions Catholics Ask About Canon Law (Cincinnati, Ohio: Servant Books/St. Anthony Messenger Press, 2007) .

External links 
 Papal Address to Bishops of Central Asia - 23 September 2001
 Overview of the sui iuris status according to the Syro-Malankara Catholic Church
 Article distinguishing between unity and uniformity, from Kottayam Catholic diocese

Latin legal terminology
Latin religious words and phrases
Canon law of the Catholic Church
Catholic particular churches sui iuris
Catholic canonical structures
Catholic Church legal terminology